MacAulay and Co. was a daily magazine show on BBC Radio Scotland. The programme was presented by comedian Fred MacAulay with a different guest presenter each week, and featured a range of guests including journalists, musicians, comedians and members of the public.

During the season of the Edinburgh Fringe, the programme was often also syndicated onto national BBC radio.

External links

BBC Radio Scotland programmes